Charles F. Adair was born on October 19, 1874 to Irish immigrant parents in Bear Valley, California. His father immigrated to the United States in 1833 and in 1860 moved west into Mariposa County as part of a company of men with John Fremont. Charles was one of the families six children all of whom lived in Mariposa county. Early in life Charles worked as a miner in California and later Arizona until 1914 when he became one of the first park rangers in Yosemite National Park. In 1929 he was made acting Park Forester for a year where he planted two giant sequoia trees near the ranger housing in Yosemite Valley. He is responsible for introducing golden trout into Adair lake in Yosemite which was named after him for doing this.

References

National Park Service personnel
Yosemite National Park
1874_births
1936 deaths
People from Mariposa County, California